Thomas Iverson Poorman (October 19, 1857 – February 18, 1905) was a Major League Baseball outfielder and pitcher. Poorman played in the majors from - for the New York Metropolitans, Buffalo Bisons, Chicago White Stockings, Toledo Blue Stockings, Philadelphia Athletics, and Boston Beaneaters.

See also
 List of Major League Baseball annual triples leaders
 List of Major League Baseball career stolen bases leaders

References

External links

1857 births
1905 deaths
Major League Baseball outfielders
Baseball players from Pennsylvania
Philadelphia Athletics (AA) players
Chicago White Stockings players
Toledo Blue Stockings players
Boston Beaneaters players
Buffalo Bisons (NL) players
19th-century baseball players
New York New Yorks players
New York Metropolitans (minor league) players
Toledo Blue Stockings (minor league) players
Indianapolis Hoosiers (minor league) players
Milwaukee Brewers (minor league) players
Milwaukee Creams players
Sioux City Corn Huskers players
Minneapolis Millers (baseball) players
Omaha Lambs players
Lockhaven Maroons players
Shamokin Reds players
People from Lock Haven, Pennsylvania